Nick Alphin is an American sound engineer. He was nominated for an Academy Award in the category Best Sound for the film The River.

Selected filmography
 The River (1984)

References

External links

Year of birth missing (living people)
Living people
American audio engineers